Adam Tomek Sarota (born 28 December 1988) is an Australian footballer who plays as a central midfielder.

Career

Club

Brisbane Roar
Sarota was named National Youth League Player of the Year for 2008–2009. As a result of his solid performances for the Brisbane Roar youth team, he was rewarded with a first team contract prior to the 2009–10 A-League season. On 2 November 2008 he made his A-League debut for the Brisbane Roar against the Newcastle Jets.

Utrecht
On 2 April 2010, along with fellow Brisbane Roar players, Michael Zullo and Tommy Oar, Sarota joined Dutch side Utrecht on a three-year deal, in a collective transfer deal rumoured to be worth in excess of A$1.8 million. On 22 July 2010, Adam made his Utrecht debut coming on in the 70th minute of their away draw to Tirana in the UEFA Europa League.

Loan to Brisbane Roar
On 20 September 2014, Sarota was loaned to Brisbane Roar for a season to add squad depth across all positions.

International career
On 27 August 2010, it was reported Sarota had been invited to a training camp by the Polish Football Association. Sarota's father, Tony, emigrated to Australia from Poland but said that whilst Poland was a possibility, the Socceroos were Sarota's preferred option.

Sarota received his first Socceroos call up by coach Holger Osieck for a friendly match against Germany played on 27 March 2011. He made his international debut for Australia in August 2011, coming on as a substitute for FC Utrecht teammate Michael Zullo in a win over Wales.

After sustaining a serious knee and ankle injury in 2016, Sarota was injured for over 12 months and subsequently retired from professional football.

Career statistics

Honours

Individual
 National Youth League Player of the Year: 2008–09

External links
 
Adam Sarota at Aussie Footballers
 Voetbal International profile

References

Living people
1988 births
Association football midfielders
Australian soccer players
Indigenous Australian soccer players
Australia international soccer players
Australian expatriate soccer players
A-League Men players
Brisbane Strikers FC players
Brisbane Roar FC players
FC Utrecht players
Eredivisie players
Eerste Divisie players
Expatriate footballers in the Netherlands
Australian people of Polish descent